Costa Rica competed at the 2002 Winter Olympics in Salt Lake City, United States.

Cross-country skiing

Men
Sprint

Pursuit

1 Starting delay based on 10 km C. results. 
C = Classical style, F = Freestyle

Notes

References
Official Olympic Reports

 Olympic Winter Games 2002, full results by sports-reference.com

Nations at the 2002 Winter Olympics
2002 Winter Olympics
Winter Olympics